Thalapula Palli or Thalupulapalle (Village ID 596460), is a village in Puthala Pattu Mandal in Chittoor district in the state of Andhra Pradesh in India. According to the 2011 census it has a population of 1762 living in 468 households. Its main agriculture product is gur growing.

References 

Villages in Chittoor district